Saman County is in Chaharmahal and Bakhtiari province, Iran. The capital of the county is the city of Saman. At the 2006 census, the region's population (as Saman District of Shahrekord County) was 34,457 in 9,273 households. The following census in 2011 counted 35,895 people in 10,772 households. At the 2016 census, the population was 34,616 in 11,080 households, by which time the district had been separated from the county to become Saman County.

Administrative divisions

The population history and structural changes of Saman County's administrative divisions over three consecutive censuses are shown in the following table. The latest census shows two districts, four rural districts, and one city.

References

 

Counties of Chaharmahal and Bakhtiari Province